KNIZ (90.1 FM) is a variety formatted radio station in Gallup, New Mexico.

The station's programming includes music programs of various formats, including classical, jazz, Native American music, along with progressive news programming from Pacifica Radio.

The station was assigned the KNIZ call letters by the Federal Communications Commission on July 14, 2009.

See also
List of community radio stations in the United States

References

External links
 KNIZ official website

Native American radio
NIZ
Community radio stations in the United States